is a railway station in Shinagawa, Tokyo, Japan, operated by the private railway operator Tokyu Corporation and the Tokyo subway operator Toei Subway.

Station layout

Tokyu platforms 
Two elevated side platforms.

Toei platforms
An underground island platform. The station number is A-03.

History

July 6, 1927: The station opens on the Meguro-Kamata Electric Railway Oimachi Line.
November 15, 1968: The Toei station opens on what is then called Toei Line 1.
January 1, 1978: Toei Line 1 is renamed the Toei Asakusa Line.

Bus services

  bus stop

References

Railway stations in Tokyo
Tokyu Oimachi Line
Stations of Tokyu Corporation
Toei Asakusa Line
Stations of Tokyo Metropolitan Bureau of Transportation
Railway stations in Japan opened in 1927
Railway stations in Japan opened in 1968